Syed Ishrat Abbas, (1928 – 8 November 1980) better known by his stage name Darpan 
(), was one of the original romantic heroes of the "golden age" of Pakistan's film industry (also commonly known as Lollywood).

Background
Syed Ishrat Abbas was born into a middle-class Shia Muslim family originally from the United Provinces of India, where he was born in 1928. His older brother, Santosh Kumar, was also a film actor. Another brother, S. Suleman, is a film director.

Career
Darpan was introduced in the film Amanat in 1950 and went on to feature in the Pakistani Punjabi film Billo in 1951. After starring in a few more films produced in Lahore, he decided to try his luck in India, where he only had moderate level of success. Notable films from this period include Barati (1954), and Adl-e-Jehangir (1955) opposite Meena Kumari. 
 
Darpan came back to Lahore after a few years, where the film industry was then booming, and he acted in Baap Ka Gunah (1957). He had a breakthrough with his self-produced film Sathi. Raat Ke Rahi (1960), Saheli, Gulfam, Qaidi, Anchal, Baji, Shikwa, Ik Tera Sahara and Naela (1965) were some big films in which he played vital roles. Critics applauded his lead role performance back in Pakistan's film Saheli (1960) in which he starred alongside Nayyar Sultana and Shamim Ara. 

He won a Best Actor Nigar Award for his performance in Saheli (1960), as well as a Presidential award. His last big film as hero was Payal Ki Jhankar in 1966. He was the hero in two of Waheed Murad's produced films Insaan Badalta Hai and Jab Se Dekha Hai Tumhen. He played the villain in Ik Gunah Aur Sahi, and was a supporting actor in Khuda Te Maan, Jub Jub Phool Khile (1975) and a few other films.

Family life
Darpan was a good-looking and attractive man with hazel eyes and a rich playboy's smile. At first glance, he seemed like a non-serious flirt and a 'lady killer'. At least, that was his 'professional image as an actor'. He used to play non-serious fun-loving roles in the movies quite unlike his older actor brother Santosh Kumar who used to take serious romantic roles in the Pakistani movies of the 1950s and 1960s.

When it came to marriage, Darpan fell for a shy, typically eastern and a lady-like fellow actress, Nayyar Sultana. They had been paired together earlier in a super-hit Pakistani film Saheli (1960) which also starred Shamim Ara and was directed by veteran film director S. M. Yusuf.

Death
He died in Lahore on 8 November 1980 at age 52.

Awards and recognition
Nigar Award for Best Actor for film Saathi (1959)
Nigar Award for Best Actor for film Saheli (1960)

Filmography
Darpan did a total of 67 films - 57 films in Urdu language, 8 in Punjabi language and 2 films in Pashto language.

In India
 Barati (1954 film)
 Adl-e-Jehangir (1955)

In Pakistan
 1950 Amanat
 1951 Billo
 1957 Baap Ka Gunah
 1957 Noor-e-Islam, with Swaran Lata and Naeem Hashmi
 1958 Mukhra
 1958 Rukhsana
 1959 Sahara
 1959 Khullja Sim Sim, with Yasmeen and Naeem Hashmi
 1959 Shama, with Neelo, Swaran Lata and Naeem Hashmi
 1959 Saathi, with Husna and Naeem Hashmi
 1960 Noukri
 1960 Saheli
 1961 Insaan badalta hai
 1961 Gulfam
 1961 Lakhon Fasane
 1962 Qaidi
 1962 Mousiqaar
 1962 Aanchal
 1963 Jab se dekha hai tumhen
 1963 Yahudi ki larki
 1963 Baji
 1963 Shikwa
 1963 Dulhan
 1963 Ik Tera Sahara
 1963 Tange Wala
 1964 Baap ka Baap
 1964 Shikari
 1964 Inspector
 1964 Shabab
 1965 Koh-e-Qaaf
 1965 Naila
 1966 Al-hilaal
 1966 Hamrahi
 1966 Jalwah
 1966 Mere Mehboob
 1966 Payal Ki Jhankar
 1966 Mojza
 1967 Sham Savera
 1967 Bahadur
 1967 Sitamgar
 1967 Shola Aur Shabnam
 1968 Baalam
 1968 Ik Musafar Ik Haseena
 1968 Saiqa
 1969 Meri Bhabi
 1969 Fasana-e-Dil
 1970 Hamjoli
 1973 Azmat
 1973 Khuda Te Maan
 1974 Jawab Do
 1975 Izzat
 1975 Aik Gunnah Aur Sahi
 1975 Jub Jub Phool Khile

See also 
 List of Lollywood actors

References

External links

1928 births
1980 deaths
Muhajir people
Pakistani male film actors
Nigar Award winners
Pakistani Shia Muslims
20th-century Pakistani male actors
Male actors from Lahore
Male actors in Urdu cinema
People from Lahore